The St. Charles City Police Department (also known as the SCPD) is the primary law enforcement agency for the U.S. City of St. Charles, Missouri.

Police Zones

The City of Saint Charles is divided into 7 zones for the purpose of police service.

Regional SWAT Team

The St. Charles County Regional SWAT Team is a regional team that encompasses members from the county law enforcement agencies, under the direction of the St. Charles County Sheriff's Department.

References

See also

 List of law enforcement agencies in Missouri

Municipal police departments of Missouri
St. Charles, Missouri